Koyi K Utho is a Colombian industrial metal band, formed in 1999 in Bogotá, Colombia. The band's name Koyi k utho was selected as a tribute to the Mazinger Z's character, Koyi Kabuto.

Name
The name Koyi K Utho has various meanings: The K in the middle resembles a kanji, the same used by samurai before combat to resupply energy and power. The philosophy of the band talks about the evolution of the man-machine symbiosis, but with man always in control.

The band's name was chosen as a tribute to Mazinger Z. In their concerts, and in the personal makeup of the members, a heavy manga influence can be seen.

Sound 
The band is focused on all types of industrial, specifically industrial metal. They combine the energy and aggressiveness of punk, metal, industrial and electronic music. But as the band's website says: Do not confuse aggressiveness with violence.
 
The band's music is influenced by groups as Prong, Cubanate, Fear Factory, Front Line Assembly, Pantera, Sex Pistols, D.R.I., Static-X, and others.

Line-up 
 Zetha - drums
 Guik - guitars
 Jhiro- vocals
 Lex- bass
 Mr Fuckars - keyboards

Discography 
 Evilution (2016) LP
 vio-logic (2007) LP
 Mechanical Human Prototype (2004) LP
 DC música Rock Compilation (2003) (Koyi K Utho features its song Neutral Perversion Mix)
 KOYI K UTHO Single (2002)

Videography 
Freakman
Demential State
Personal Jesus
Experimental Ape
Mechanical Animal
Fire on Fire
Decode
Artificial Illness
Evil Lution
Black Clones

External links 
Official band website
MySpace Site
Purevolume.com entry

Colombian heavy metal musical groups
Industrial metal musical groups
Musical groups established in 1999
Musical quintets
Musical groups from Bogotá
1999 establishments in Colombia